Teknisk Ukeblad (TU) is a Norwegian engineering magazine. The magazine has its headquarters in Oslo, Norway.

History and profile
TU has appeared weekly since 13 April 1883 and was published by Ingeniørforlaget, now Teknisk Ukeblad Media jointly owned by three national professional associations of engineers and architects: the Norwegian Society of Engineers and Technologists (NITO, founded 1936), Tekna (founded in 1874), and the Norwegian Polytechnic Society (PF, founded 1852).

On 24 June 2010 TU had a total circulation of 302,000 weekly copies.

Corresponding publications are Ny Teknik in Sweden, Ingeniøren in Denmark and Technisch Weekblad in the Netherlands.

References

External links 
Teknisk Ukeblad, the magazine's website
Teknisk Ukeblad, some older volumes digitized by Project Runeberg

1883 establishments in Norway
Engineering magazines
Magazines established in 1883
Magazines published in Oslo
Norwegian-language magazines
Science and technology magazines
Weekly magazines published in Norway